The Artist and Journal of Home Culture, also The Artist, was a monthly art and design journal published in London by Archibald Constable & Co. from 1880 to 1902. From 1881 to 1894 the full title was The Artist and Journal of Home Culture. From 1896 the full title became The Artist: An Illustrated Monthly Record of Arts, Crafts and Industries. An American edition was published in New York by Truslove, Hanson & Comba.

Under the editorship of Charles Kains Jackson, 1888–94, The Artist and Journal of Home Culture contained a notable undercurrent of homoeroticism and had some importance in the homosexual subculture without being so overt as to alienate its mainstream readership. Described by scholar Thomas Waugh as a "closet pedophile" publication, it featured Uranian poetry and photographs of boys by Wilhelm von Gloeden.

Editors

References

1880 establishments in the United Kingdom
1902 disestablishments in the United Kingdom
Visual arts magazines published in the United Kingdom
Monthly magazines published in the United Kingdom
Constable & Co. books
Defunct magazines published in the United Kingdom
English-language magazines
Magazines published in London
Magazines established in 1880
Magazines disestablished in 1902
Design magazines